Brestovica pri Komnu is a village in the Municipality of Komen in the Littoral region of Slovenia next to the border with Italy.

Name
The name of the settlement was changed from Brestovica to Brestovica pri Komnu in 1953.

Church
The parish church in the settlement is dedicated to Saint Lawrence and belongs to the Diocese of Koper. A second church in the hamlet of Gornja Brestovica in the settlement is dedicated to Saint Anastasia.

References

External links

Brestovica pri Komnu on Geopedia

Populated places in the Municipality of Komen